1992–93 Ukrainian Cup was the second edition of the Ukrainian Cup competition. It started on July 26, 1992, with a Podillya face-off and concluded with the final on May 30, 1993. The main highlights of this season's edition was a successful play of FC Khimik Sieverodonetsk who made to the quarterfinals at expense of FC Shakhtar Donetsk, defeating them at the first stage of the Cup competition. Another sensation was the defeat of the defending champions FC Chornomorets Odessa from their city-mates SC Odessa in the first round of the competition as well. Once again teams FC Torpedo Zaporizhzhia and FC Metalist Kharkiv made to the semifinals.

The top scorer this season was Vitaliy Parakhnevych who was at the biggest fault in eliminating the Cup holders Chornomorets Odessa. FC Kryvbas Kryvyi Rih and FC Hazovyk Komarne were suspended for participation in the next year competition due to no showing up for games. Those teams were awarded a technical loss.

Team allocation 
Eighty teams entered the competition.

Transitional League did not participate and Chernihiv and Volyn oblasts did not provide their representatives to the tournament.

Distribution

Competition schedule

First preliminary round 
Almost all games were played on August 1, 1992. The Vinnytsia Oblast face-off between Podillya and Nyva took place on July 26 and Rotor challenged Polihraftekhnika on August 4, 1992.

{| width=100% cellspacing=1
!width=20%|
!width=12%|
!width=20%|
!

|- style=font-size:90%
|align=right| FC Podillia Kyrnasivka (Am)
|align=center|1:3
| (1L) FC Nyva Vinnytsia

|- style=font-size:90%
|align=right| FC Polihraftekhnika-2 Oleksandria (Am)
|align=center|1:0
| (2L) FC Dnipro Cherkasy

|- style=font-size:90%
|align=right| FC Tytan Armyansk (2L)
|align=center|1:2
| (2L) FC Chaika Sevastopol
| aet

|- style=font-size:90%
|align=right| FC Inturist Yalta (Am)
|align=center|0:1
| (1L) FC Temp Shepetivka

|- style=font-size:90%
|align=right| FC Lokomotyv Rivne (Am)
|align=center|1:0
| (1L) FC Podillya Khmelnytskyi
| aet (in Kovel)

|- style=font-size:90%
|align=right| FC Dynamo-3 Kyiv (Am)
|align=center|2:0
| (1L) FC Desna Chernihiv
| (SKA Stadium)

|- style=font-size:90%
|align=right| FC Ptakhivnyk Velyki Hai (Am)
|align=center|1:0
| (2L) FC Halychyna Drohobych
| Velyki Hai is adjacent to Ternopil

|- style=font-size:90%
|align=right| FC Hazovyk Komarne (2L) 
|align=center|0:0
| (1L) FC Skala Stryi
| aet, pk 4:2

|- style=font-size:90%
|align=right| FC Khutrovyk Tysmenytsia (Am)
|align=center|1:1
| (1L) FC Prykarpattia Ivano-Frankivsk
| aet, pk 1:3

|- style=font-size:90%
|align=right| FC Lada Chernivtsi (Am)
|align=center|1:0
| (2L) FC Dnister Zalischyki
|
|- style=font-size:90%
|align=right| FC Sokil-Lorta Lviv (Am)
|align=center|2:0
| (1L) FC Zakarpattia Uzhhorod

|- style=font-size:90%
|align=right| FC Metalist Irshava (Am)
|align=center|3:0
| (1L) FC Pryladyst Mukacheve

|- style=font-size:90%
|align=right| FC Keramik Baranivka (Am)
|align=center|2:1
| (1L) FC Krystal Chortkiv
|
|- style=font-size:90%
|align=right| FC Paperovyk Poninka (Am)
|align=center|0:4
| (2L) FC Polissya Zhytomyr

|- style=font-size:90%
|align=right| FC Zdvyzh Borodianka (Am)
|align=center|3:1
| (2L) FC ZS-Oriana Kyiv

|- style=font-size:90%
|align=right| FC Hirnyk Pavlohrad (Am)
|align=center|0:3
| (2L) FC Zirka Kirovohrad

|- style=font-size:90%
|align=right| FC Yavir Krasnopillia (2L) 
|align=center|2:0
| (1L) FC Avtomobilist Sumy

|- style=font-size:90%
|align=right| FC Khimik Sieverodonetsk (1L) 
|align=center|1:0
| (1L) FC Stal Alchevsk

|- style=font-size:90%
|align=right| FC Dynamo Luhansk (3L) 
|align=center|4:2
| (2L) FC Vahanobudivnyk Stakhanov
| aet

|- style=font-size:90%
|align=right| FC Avanhard Lozova (Am)
|align=center|0:1
| (1L) FC Naftovyk Okhtyrka
|
|- style=font-size:90%
|align=right| FC Spartak Okhtyrka (Am)
|align=center|0:1
| (1L) FC Vorskla Poltava
| Trostianets (Sumy Oblast)

|- style=font-size:90%
|align=right| FC Naftokhimik Kremenchuk (3L) 
|align=center|1:1| (1L) FC Dynamo-2 Kyiv| aet, pk 2:4|- style=font-size:90%
|align=right| FC Orbita Zaporizhia (Am)
|align=center|1:2| (1L) FC Ros Bila Tserkva|- style=font-size:90%
|align=right| FC Vuhlyk Bilozerske (Am)
|align=center|2:3| (1L) FC Shakhtar Pavlohrad| Dobropillia

|- style=font-size:90%
|align=right| FC Tavria Novotroitsk (Am)
|align=center|0:1| (1L) FC Metalurh Nikopol| aet

|- style=font-size:90%
|align=right| FC Bazhanovets Makiivka (2L) 
|align=center|2:3| (2L) FC Shakhtar-2 Donetsk|- style=font-size:90%
|align=right| FC Druzhba Osypenko (2L) 
|align=center|2:0| (2L) FC Azovets Mariupol

|- style=font-size:90%
|align=right| FC Olimpia Yuzhnoukrainsk (Am)
|align=center|3:4| (1L) SC Odessa| aet

|- style=font-size:90%
|align=right| FC Chornomorets-2 Odessa (2L) 
|align=center|1:4| (1L) FC Artania Ochakiv|- style=font-size:90%
|align=right| FC Blaho Blahoeve (Am)
|align=center|1:2| (1L) FC Evis Mykolaiv| aet (Ivanivka Raion, Odessa Oblast)

|- style=font-size:90%
|align=right| FC Meliorator Kakhovka (2L) 
|align=center|2:0| (2L) FC Krystal Kherson

|- style=font-size:90%
|align=right| FC Rotor Cherkasy (Am)
|align=center|2:3| (1L) FC Polihraftekhnika Oleksandria'|}

 Second preliminary round 
Almost all games took place on August 7, 1992. The game between Lokomotyv and junior team of Dynamo in Zdolbuniv was played a week later on August 15, 1992.

 Bracket 

 First round (1/16) 

|}
 First leg Prykarpattia won on walkover. Second leg Metalist won 7–1 on aggregate.Nyva won 2–1 on aggregate.Volyn won 4–2 on aggregate.Kremin won 5–1 on aggregate.Khimik won 5–4 on aggregate.Torpedo won 2–1 on aggregate.Veres won 3–3 on away goal rule.Metalurh won 5–2 on aggregate.Karpaty won 3–1 on aggregate.Dnipro won on walkover.Temp won 5–5 on away goal rule.Zoria won 3–2 on aggregate.Tavria won 4–1 on aggregate.Odessa won 3–3 on away goal rule.Dynamo won 10–0 on aggregate. Second round (1/8) 

|}
 First leg 

 Second leg Karpaty won 3–2 on aggregate.Metalist won 1–o on aggregate.Nyva won 3–2 on aggregate.Dynamo won 6–1 on aggregate.Volyn won 5–3 on aggregate.Khimik won 2–2 on away goal rule.Torpedo won 4–3 on aggregate.Metalurh won 4–1 on aggregate. Quarterfinals 

|}

 First leg 

 Second leg Karpaty won 3–1 on aggregate.Dynamo won 7–3 on aggregate.Metalist won 2–2 on away goal rule.Torpedo won 1–0 on aggregate. Semifinals 

|}

 First leg 

 Second leg Karpaty won 3–1 on aggregate.Dynamo won 4–1 on aggregate.''

Final

Top goalscorers 

.

Attendances

Top attendances

See also 
 1992–93 Ukrainian Premier League
 1992–93 Ukrainian First League

References 

Ukrainian Cup seasons
Cup
Ukrainian Cup